The long-finned glass tetra (Xenagoniates bondi) is a species of characin from Colombia and Venezuela.  It is the only member in its genus.

References
 

Characidae
Fish of Venezuela
Freshwater fish of Colombia
Fish described in 1942